2009–10 Guam Men's Soccer League, officially named Budweiser Guam Men's Soccer League due to sponsorship reason, is the association football league of Guam.

League standings

Division 1

Division 2
1. Hauauau
2. Ha
3.Maasas
4. Hadsasasa

References
RSSSF

Guam Soccer League seasons
Guam
Mens